αVβ3 is a type of integrin that is a receptor for vitronectin. It consists of two components, integrin alpha V and integrin beta 3 (CD61), and is expressed by platelets. Furthermore, it is a receptor for phagocytosis on macrophages or dendritic cells.

As a drug target
Integrin αVβ3 is a potential drug target because abnormal expression of v3 is linked to the development and progression of various diseases. Its role in angiogenesis, in cancer and other diseases, is linked to the blood supply for problematic overgrowths.

Inhibitors like etaracizumab may be used as antiangiogenics.

One novel protein (ProAgio) has been designed to bind at an unusual site, and then induces apoptosis by recruiting caspase 8. It is designed by mutating domain 1 of CD2 (D1-CD2), which naturally binds weakly to the receptor.

Fibronectin domain 10 contains the RGD motif that αVβ3 recognizes. A high-affinity, pure antagonist mutant has been discovered for this protein.

See also 
 Proteases in angiogenesis
 Vitaxin, a respective antibody

References

External links 
 

Integrins